Sybra trilineata is a species of beetle in the family Cerambycidae that was described by Maurice Pic in 1938.

References

trilineata
Beetles described in 1938